This article lists the lowest rounds of golf. In professional competition a round of 59 or less is regarded as a significant achievement. In men's major championships the lowest round is 62 by Branden Grace at the 2017 Open Championship. The lowest officially recorded round is 55 by Rhein Gibson in 2012. In women's major championships the lowest round is 61, held jointly by Leona Maguire, Lee Jeong-eun and Kim Hyo-joo, all at the Evian Championship.

Lowest rounds of golf
The lowest officially recorded round is 55 by Rhein Gibson (12 birdies and two eagles on a par 71) on May 12, 2012 at River Oaks Golf Club in Edmond, Oklahoma. This score is recognized by the Guinness World Records. Three other rounds of 55 are documented, but these are commonly discounted due to the length of the course or the nature of the round. On August 27, 2020, another was added, as Alexander Hughes shot a 55 in Jenks, Oklahoma, within 100 miles of where Gibson had his best day.

Possibly the lowest documented round in competitive golf is 57, achieved by (among others) Bobby Wyatt in the 2010 Alabama Boys Junior Championship, and Alex Ross in the 2019 Dogwood Invitational. Ross's round was 15-under-par for the Druid Hills Golf Club course in Atlanta, and included 13 birdies and one eagle.

Lowest rounds in professional competition

Official tournaments on major tours

Unofficial tournaments and minor tours

Notes: 
Rnd is the round in which the score was shot, i.e. 2/4 means the round was shot in the second of four rounds.
Finish is the final tournament finish of the player

Lowest rounds in men's major championships
In men's major championships the lowest round is 62 which was recorded by South African golfer Branden Grace in the third round of the 2017 Open Championship.

Many players have recorded a score of 63. Johnny Miller was the first golfer to shoot 63 in a major and was the only golfer to shoot 63 in the final round to win a major until Henrik Stenson did so as well during the 2016 Open Championship at Royal Troon Golf Club. Greg Norman, Vijay Singh and Brooks Koepka are the only golfers to record two rounds of 63 in the majors.

Lowest rounds in women's professional competition

Official tournaments on major tours
There have been 3 rounds of 58 recorded on the Ladies European Tour, all in the Bloor Homes Eastleigh Classic. These rounds were achieved by Trish Johnson (1990), Jane Connachan (1991) and Dale Reid (1991). This tournament was played on a par 65 public golf course. The lowest Ladies European Tour round on a course with par of minimum 70 has been 61.

Lowest rounds in women's major championships

In women's major championships the lowest round is 61, which has been recorded by three golfers: Leona Maguire, Lee Jeong-eun and Kim Hyo-joo.

Perfect round
A perfect round is a round of eighteen holes where all holes were played on average at one under par (average of birdie on every hole) resulting in a score of 55 on a par 73 course, 54 on a par 72 course, 53 on a par 71 course, and 52 on a par 70 course. 

There is a philosophy popularized by Pia Nilsson's Vision 54 that concentrates on achieving the perfect round, the basic ideology being that striving for perfection results in better scores even if the goal is not met. Cecilia Ekelundh, of the Ladies European Tour keeps the perfect round on her mind by drawing a 54 on the ball she plays in competition.

References

Rounds
Rounds